Moolap railway station is a closed railway station on the Queenscliff railway line. It was opened on August 1, 1881 and closed on March 10, 1936. It served the workers at the salt works. On January 1, 1923 it became a request stop as traffic dropped exponentially after World War I and buses and trams became a faster way of travel.

References

Disused railway stations in Victoria (Australia)